Loch Ard was an iron-hulled clipper ship that was built in Scotland in 1873 and wrecked on the Shipwreck Coast of Victoria, Australia in 1878.

Building
Charles Connell and Company of Scotstoun, Glasgow built Loch Ard for the General Shipping Company, part of the Loch Line of Glasgow that operated between Great Britain and Australia. Her yard number was 57 and she was launched on 8 November 1873. She had three masts and was a full-rigged ship.

Her owners registered Loch Ard in Glasgow. Her official number was 68061 and her code letters were WSGD.

The ship was named after Loch Ard in Scotland, a loch west of Aberfoyle and east of Loch Lomond. It means "high lake" in Scottish Gaelic. She gave her name to Loch Ard Gorge on the Shipwreck Coast.

Maiden voyage
Loch Ard was twice dismasted on her maiden voyage from Glasgow to Melbourne. The first dismasting was in December 1873, only days after leaving Glasgow. She was able to turn back and be repaired. On 26 January 1874 she left Glasgow for the second time. On 2 April a gale in the Southern Ocean broke all three of her masts. On the fourth day after the accident, her crew managed to bale her out and make jury-masts. She reached Melbourne on 24 May.

Final voyage

Loch Ard left Gravesend, Kent on 1 March 1878, bound for Melbourne, commanded by Captain George Gibbs and with a crew of 37 men and 17 passengers, a total of 54 people. She was loaded with a general mixed cargo. On 1 June she was approaching Melbourne. The crew expected to sight land but encountered heavy fog. The inquest determined that, unable to see the Cape Otway lighthouse; having faulty chronometers on board; and not having been able to take a reading to establish his exact position due to bad weather conditions over the previous few days, Gibbs was unaware how close he was running to the coast. The fog lifted around 4am, revealing breakers and cliff faces. Gibbs quickly ordered sail to be set to come about and get clear of the coast, but they were unable to do so in time, and ran aground on a reef. The masts and rigging came down, killing some people on deck and preventing the lifeboats from being launched effectively. The ship sank within 10 or 15 minutes of striking the reef.

The widespread popular belief that Gibbs mistook the opening of the nearby Loch Ard Gorge for Port Phillip Heads has no basis in fact or probability. There is no physical or cartographic resemblance whatever, ships are obliged to stop outside the Heads to take on a pilot, and Loch Ard never entered the Gorge.

The only two survivors of the wreck were Eva Carmichael, who survived by clinging to a spar for five hours, and Thomas Pearce, an apprentice who clung to the upturned hull of a lifeboat. Pearce came ashore first, then heard Carmichael's shouts and went back into the ocean to rescue her. They came ashore at what is now known as Loch Ard Gorge and sheltered there before seeking help.

Surviving artefacts

Loch Ard'''s cargo included various luxury goods, including a grand piano which later washed up in the Gorge, and a large decorative porcelain peacock made by Minton in England, intended to be displayed in the Melbourne International Exhibition in 1880. The peacock was recovered intact and was eventually able to be displayed a century later for the Victoria Pavilion at the Brisbane 1988 World Exposition. It is now on display at the Flagstaff Hill Maritime Museum in Warrnambool, Victoria, along with other relics of the wreck.

It is a recreational wreck diving site, rated "Advanced Open Water and beyond".

PlayEva and the Cabin Boy by Sheila Dewey, produced at the Warehouse Theatre in Croydon in 1994, concerned the Loch Ard shipwreck.

See also
 List of disasters in Australia by death toll

References

Sources
 
 
 

Further reading

  – score of a schottische dance composed to raise money for the Loch Ard'' fund, with a photograph of Tom Pearce on the cover

External links
 
 Interview with the Loch Ard Peacock, by Foundation Expo '88
  – photographs of Eva Carmichael and Tom Pearce

1873 ships
Maritime incidents in June 1878
Sailing ships of the United Kingdom
Ships built in Glasgow
Shipwrecks of Victoria (Australia)
Three-masted ships
Victorian-era merchant ships of the United Kingdom